Clément Nzali (born 12 August 1959) is a Cameroonian judoka. He competed in the men's middleweight event at the 1984 Summer Olympics.

References

1959 births
Living people
Cameroonian male judoka
Olympic judoka of Cameroon
Judoka at the 1984 Summer Olympics
Place of birth missing (living people)
20th-century Cameroonian people